Tržič is a town in northern Slovenia, close to the Austrian border. It is the seat of the Municipality of Tržič.

Geography
The town is located within the historic Upper Carniola region on the Tržič Bistrica River, a left tributary of the Sava. In the north, a road leads up to the Loibl Pass in the Karawanks mountain range, the border with the Austrian state of Carinthia.

History

A first settlement named Forum in Lubelino was founded on the Roman road that ran from the ancient city of Emona (in present-day Ljubljana) via Loibl Pass to Virunum and the Zollfeld plain in the Noricum province (present-day Carinthia). After a massive landslide caused by an earthquake, the original settlement was destroyed and many people moved down the valley to establish a new village named Neumarktl in German where Tržič is now located (these events are the basis of the legend about the origin of Tržič).

The settlement in the Duchy of Carniola was granted market rights to hold weekly fairs by the Habsburg emperor Frederick III in 1492, which further promoted the development of the town. The great fire of 1811, which destroyed the buildings on the left bank of the Tržič Bistrica River, changed the town. Much of the architecture was reconstructed in a Classicist style. After the buildings were rebuilt they needed to have firewalls, iron doors, and window covers, a very rare feature in Europe. The town center of Tržič has been protected as a cultural heritage site since 1985. Over centuries, the city had been a German language island.

Economy
The leather, wood, and textile industries were important to the economy of Tržič in the past but industrial activity declined after the breakup of Yugoslavia. The development of small business after this period is now an important branch of the economy.

Because of its alpine setting, alpine skiing is popular in the surrounding area.

Notable people
Notable people that were born or lived in Tržič include:
 Feliks Anton Dev (a.k.a. Johannes Damascenus a nomine Mariae, 1732–1786), poet, translator, and editor
 Countess Francisca von Strassoldo Grafenberg (1781–1854), wife of Austrian General Joseph Radetzky
 Ivan Bobersky (1873–1947), Ukrainian politician and sports leader

References

External links

Tržič at Geopedia
Tourism information (Slovenian)
Unofficial website about Tržič (Slovenian)

Populated places in the Municipality of Tržič
Cities and towns in Upper Carniola